"Money On You" is a song co-written and recorded by Canadian country artist Chad Brownlee. He wrote the song with Gavin Slate, Travis Wood, and producer Todd Clark. It was released as a single from the deluxe edition of Brownlee's studio album Back in the Game.

Background
Brownlee stated that the song is "a fresh vibe musically you haven’t heard from me before about betting it all on a relationship". He said he picked the song to be a single largely because "the message is positive to help balance out all the negative content that we are bombarded with on a daily basis".

Commercial performance
"Money On You" peaked at number seven on the Billboard Canada Country chart, marking Brownlee's thirteenth top ten hit. It also reached a peak of number 96 on the Canadian Hot 100.

Charts

References

2020 songs
2020 singles
Chad Brownlee songs
Universal Music Canada singles
Songs written by Chad Brownlee
Songs written by Todd Clark
Songs written by Gavin Slate
Songs written by Travis Wood (songwriter)
Song recordings produced by Todd Clark